Thorpe-le-Soken railway station is on the Sunshine Coast Line, a branch of the Great Eastern Main Line, in the East of England, serving the village of Thorpe-le-Soken, Essex. It is  down the line from London Liverpool Street. Its three-letter station code is TLS.

The station was opened by the Tendring Hundred Railway, a subsidiary of the Great Eastern Railway, in 1866. It is currently managed by Greater Anglia, which also operates all trains serving the station.

History 
The station was opened with the name Thorpe by the Tendring Hundred Railway, a subsidiary of the Great Eastern Railway, on 28 July 1866 on the Tendring Hundred Extension Railway line. It was renamed Thorpe-le-Soken on 1 March 1900.

It has two platforms forming an island platform that is accessible via a footbridge. There is a clearly visible platform and trackbed on what would be platform 3; this is continuous with the other stations on the Walton branch. One of the double tracks that were originally on the line to Walton has been completely taken up.

Services
The typical off-peak services pattern is:

During peak hours there are some additional services to and from Liverpool Street.

References

External links 

Railway stations in Essex
DfT Category E stations
Former Great Eastern Railway stations
Greater Anglia franchise railway stations
Railway stations in Great Britain opened in 1866
Thorpe-le-Soken